The AN/ASQ-213 HARM targeting system is a targeting pod mounted to the side of an F-16 aircraft that enables the aircraft to track the location of hostile radar systems that can then be engaged with AGM-88 HARM or other air-to-surface weapons.

References

 US Air Force HARM Targeting Pod Page
 US Air Force

Raytheon Company products
Targeting pods
Military electronics of the United States